Michael, Mike, Mick or Micky Burke may refer to:

Politics and law
Michael Burke (New South Wales colonial politician) (1843–1909), Australian politician from New South Wales
Michael E. Burke (1863–1918), American politician from Wisconsin
Michael Burke (Australian politician) (1865–1937), Australian politician from New South Wales
Michael J. Burke (born 1958), Illinois State Supreme Court justice

Sports
Mike Burke (shortstop) (1854–1889), American Major League Baseball player
Micky Burke (1904–1984), Scottish football forward
Mick Burke (mountaineer) (1941–1975), English mountaineer and climbing cameraman
Mick Burke (Gaelic footballer) (born 1941), Irish Gaelic footballer
Mike Burke (punter) (born 1950), American football punter
Mick Burke (rugby league) (born 1958), English rugby league footballer
Mike Burke (strongman) (born 1974), American professional strongman competitor
Michael Burke (soccer) (born 1977), American Major League Soccer player
Michael Burke (Gaelic footballer) (born 1985), Irish Gaelic football player

Others
Michael Burke, 10th Earl of Clanricarde (1686–1726), Irish peer
Michael Burke (poet) (c. 1800–1881), Irish poet
E. Michael Burke (1916–1987), American naval officer, CIA operative, circus, television and sports executive
Michael Reilly Burke (born 1964), American actor
Mike Burke (journalist), American journalist and senior producer of Democracy Now!
Michael Burke (economist), Irish economist

See also 

Michael Buerk (born 1946), English newsreader and journalist